Leasowe and Moreton East (previously Leasowe, 1973 to 2004) is a Wirral Metropolitan Borough Council ward in the Wallasey Parliamentary constituency.

Councillors

References

Wards of Merseyside
Politics of the Metropolitan Borough of Wirral
Wards of the Metropolitan Borough of Wirral